Provincial elections were held in British India in January 1946 to elect members of the legislative councils of British Indian provinces.

List of Members of the 2nd Provincial Assembly of Sindh 

Tenure of the 2nd provincial assembly was from 12 March 1946 to September 1946.

See also 
 List of members of the 1st Provincial Assembly of Sindh
 List of members of the 3rd Provincial Assembly of Sindh
 List of members of the 4th Provincial Assembly of Sindh
 Sindh
 Pakistan
 British India

References 

Provincial Assembly of Sindh